There are at least 15 named lakes and reservoirs in Cascade County, Montana.

Lakes
 Benton Lake, el. , location of Benton Lake National Wildlife Refuge
 Black Horse Lake, el. 
 Cannon Lake, el. 
 Horseshoe Lake, el. 
 Schrammeck Lake, el.

Reservoirs
 Cascade Reservoir, el. 
 Dick Golie Fish Pond, el. 
 Elizabeth Reservoir, el. 
 Gollaher Reservoir, el. 
 Hound Creek Reservoir, el. 
 Middle Creek Lake, el. 
 Morony Reservoir, el. 
 Neihart Reservoir, el. 
 Rocky Reef Reservoir, el. 
 Spring Creek Reservoir, el.

See also
 List of lakes in Montana

Notes

Bodies of water of Cascade County, Montana
Cascade